Cem Kargın (born 20 March 1978) is a Turkish professional retired footballer played as a left back.

References

1978 births
Living people
Footballers from İzmir
Turkish footballers
Altay S.K. footballers
İzmirspor footballers
Eskişehirspor footballers
Bucaspor footballers
Yimpaş Yozgatspor footballers
Kayseri Erciyesspor footballers
Kayserispor footballers
Malatyaspor footballers
Orduspor footballers
Boluspor footballers
Vanspor footballers
Akçaabat Sebatspor footballers
Association football fullbacks
Association football defenders